Vilius Aleliūnas (born October 19, 1987 in Panevėžys) is a Lithuanian orienteering competitor. At the World Games in 2013 he won a bronze medal in the middle distance, behind Matthias Kyburz and Daniel Hubmann, and ahead of Rasmus Thrane Hansen.

References

External links
 
 

1987 births
Living people
Sportspeople from Panevėžys
Lithuanian orienteers
Male orienteers
Foot orienteers
World Games bronze medalists

Competitors at the 2013 World Games
World Games medalists in orienteering